North Beer is a hamlet in the parish of Boyton in north Cornwall, England. North Beer is west of Boyton.

References

Hamlets in Cornwall